The 1990 Cleveland Browns season was the team's 41st season with the National Football League.

The season was the second for head coach Bud Carson, but the Browns started the season 2–7. They failed to approach their 9–6–1 record from 1989, finishing 3–13 and missing the playoffs for the first time since 1984. Carson was fired one day after a Week Nine shutout loss to the eventual AFC Champion Buffalo Bills. He was replaced by former Browns quarterback Jim Shofner, who finished the season with only one additional win.

The 1990 Browns surrendered 462 points, the largest number scored against any NFL team during the 1990s. Their -234 point differential is the third-worst figure for any 1990s NFL season and even worse than the 1999 Browns expansion team.

Offseason

NFL draft

Personnel

Staff

Roster

Schedule 

Note: Intra-division opponents are in bold text.

Standings

Game Summaries

Week 15: vs. Atlanta

Week 17 at Bengals

References

External links 
 1990 Cleveland Browns at Pro Football Reference (Profootballreference.com)
 1990 Cleveland Browns Statistics at jt-sw.com
 1990 Cleveland Browns Schedule at jt-sw.com
 1990 Cleveland Browns at DatabaseFootball.com  

Cleveland
Cleveland Browns seasons
Cleveland